The 2005–06 FA Premier League (known as the FA Barclays Premiership for sponsorship reasons) began on 13 August 2005, and concluded on 7 May 2006. The season saw Chelsea retain their title after defeating Manchester United 3–0 at Stamford Bridge towards the end of April. On the same day, West Bromwich Albion and Birmingham City were relegated, joining Sunderland in the Championship for the following season. Chelsea drew the record they set  the previous season, with 29 wins in home and away campaigns.

Season summary
Several clubs reported disappointing attendances and/or trouble selling out their grounds for the opening weeks' matches. Many have argued that this was due mainly to the comparatively early season start and the Ashes Test cricket series which caught the nation's imagination and which England went on to win. Other possible reasons are continued escalation of ticket prices and the increasing number of games shown on television (which has had the knock on effect of greater variation in kick-off times). The overall decline in attendances for the season was only around 2%, but that figure is reduced by the fact that bigger clubs were promoted into the Premiership than were relegated and several clubs have suffered larger falls.

For the second time in two seasons, José Mourinho's Chelsea triumphed in the Premier League, with a home win over closest rivals Manchester United confirming them as champions after a record setting albeit tense season.

Chelsea's early season form with 14 wins out of 16 gave the champions an unequivocal head start. With Manchester United, Arsenal and Liverpool falling way short of their expectations before Christmas, Chelsea had effectively become champions-elect by early 2006. However, a sudden collapse in form by mid-March caused their seemingly unassailable lead of 16 points to be cut to just 7 in two months due to the impressive late run of form of Manchester United, who went on a nine-match winning streak scoring over 20 goals. However, a shock home draw with bottom of the table Sunderland at Old Trafford killed United's title hopes. The momentum was back with Chelsea who didn't need a second bite at the apple with wins over Bolton, Everton and finally Manchester United giving the west Londoners their second successive championship under Mourinho.

The top two clubs at the end of the season earned the right to participate in the UEFA Champions League group stages, while the third- and fourth-placed clubs get places in the Champions League Third Qualifying Round (where they progress to the Champions League group stages if they win or the UEFA Cup if they lose). However, if an English team wins the Champions League, but finishes outside the top four, then they get the final Champions League spot instead of the fourth-placed club, who have to settle for a place in the UEFA Cup. This could have been the case with Arsenal and Tottenham Hotspur, but Arsenal pipped Spurs to fourth place in the final matchday of the season before losing 2–1 to FC Barcelona in the final of the UEFA Champions League.

The fifth-placed club always earns a spot in the UEFA Cup. The winners of the FA Cup also earn a place in the UEFA Cup. If they have already qualified for European competition by their league position or winning the League Cup, then the FA Cup runners-up get their place. If the runners-up, too, have already qualified, then the highest league finisher who have not already qualified for Europe (normally sixth place) are given the place. This season, the FA Cup final featured Liverpool and West Ham. Since Liverpool finished third they were assured of a spot in the Champions League qualifying round, which in turn meant that West Ham received the cup winner's UEFA Cup place.

The League Cup winners also qualify for the UEFA Cup. If they have already qualified for European competition through other means then their place is, unlike the FA Cup, not awarded to the runner-up, but instead the highest league finisher who has not qualified for Europe. League Cup winners Manchester United finished second, placing them directly into the Champions League group stage. This meant that the sixth-placed club, Blackburn Rovers, qualified for the UEFA Cup. The team directly after the UEFA Cup places, goes into the UEFA Intertoto Cup which means in turn, if the team – Newcastle United this season – wins a 2-legged match means they earn a place in the qualifying round of the UEFA Cup.

2005-06 also saw the final action of two of the most successful players in English football, Alan Shearer (last played for Newcastle United) and Dennis Bergkamp (last played for Arsenal).

Teams
Twenty teams competed in the league – the top seventeen teams from the previous season and the three teams promoted from the Championship. The promoted teams were Sunderland, Wigan Athletic and West Ham United. Sunderland and West Ham United returned to the top flight after an absence of two years while Wigan Athletic played in the top flight for the first time in history. They replaced Crystal Palace, Norwich City (both teams relegated after a season's presence) and Southampton (ending their top flight spell of twenty-seven years).

Stadiums and locations

Personnel and kits

Managerial changes

League table

Results

Top scorers

Most assists

Awards

Monthly awards

Annual awards

PFA Players' Player of the Year
The PFA Players' Player of the Year award for 2006 was won by Steven Gerrard.

The shortlist for the PFA Players' Player of the Year award was as follows:
Thierry Henry (Arsenal)
Wayne Rooney (Manchester United)
Steven Gerrard (Liverpool)
Joe Cole (Chelsea)
Frank Lampard (Chelsea)
John Terry (Chelsea)

PFA Young Player of the Year
The PFA Young Player of the Year award was won by Wayne Rooney.

The shortlist for the award was as follows:
Darren Bent (Charlton Athletic)
Cesc Fàbregas (Arsenal)
Anton Ferdinand (West Ham United)
Wayne Rooney (Manchester United)
Aaron Lennon (Tottenham Hotspur)
Cristiano Ronaldo (Manchester United)

PFA Team of the Year

Goalkeeper: Shay Given (Newcastle United)
Defence: Pascal Chimbonda (Wigan Athletic), Jamie Carragher (Liverpool), John Terry, William Gallas (both Chelsea)
Midfield: Steven Gerrard (Liverpool), Cristiano Ronaldo (Manchester United), Frank Lampard (Chelsea), Joe Cole (Chelsea)

Attack: Thierry Henry (Arsenal), Wayne Rooney (Manchester United)

PFA Fans' Player of the Year
Wayne Rooney, was named the PFA Fans' Player of the Year for 2006.

FWA Footballer of the Year
The FWA Footballer of the Year award for 2006 was won by Thierry Henry for a record third time. No other player has won the accolade on as many occasions as the Arsenal player in the award's long history.

Premier League Player of the Season
Arsenal's Thierry Henry won the Premier League Player of the Season award for the second time.

Premier League Manager of the Season
José Mourinho was awarded the Premier League Manager of the Season award after he led Chelsea to their second premier league title in two years, their third league title in their history. This title was also his second time of winning the award in as many seasons.

Premier League Golden Boot
Thierry Henry was named the winner of the Premier League Golden Boot award. The Arsenal striker scored 27 goals in the league and was presented with the award at Arsenal's last game at Highbury.

Premier League Golden Glove
Liverpool goalkeeper Pepe Reina won the Premier League Golden Glove award for the first time. He achieved clean sheets in 20 Premier League games.

Premier League Fair Play League
The Premier League Fair Play League was won by Charlton Athletic, ahead of fellow London team Arsenal. The least sporting side was Blackburn Rovers.

See also
2005–06 in English football

References

External links
2005–06 FA Premier League Season at RSSSF
2005/2006 League table from sportpress

 
Premier League seasons
Eng
1